Jim Webb is an American film audio engineer. He won an Academy Award for Best Sound and was nominated for another one in the same category.

Selected filmography
Webb won an Academy Award for Best Sound and was nominated for another:

Won
 All the President's Men (1976)

Nominated
 The Rose (1979)

Personal life

Webb graduated in 1962 from the Audio Engineering Society.

References

External links

Year of birth missing (living people)
Living people
American audio engineers
Best Sound BAFTA Award winners
Best Sound Mixing Academy Award winners
CAS Career Achievement Award honorees